Real Pinball, known in Japan as 
, is a video game developed by Japan Dataworks and published by Panasonic for the 3DO.

Gameplay
Real Pinball features a choice of five pinball machines that become increasingly more complicated. Allows for multiball play.

Reception

Next Generation reviewed the game, rating it one star out of five, and stated that "3DO owners will have to wait a little bit longer for a 'real' pinball game to appear."

Reviews
Video Games & Computer Entertainment - Nov, 1994
The Pixel Empire - Apr, 2014

Notes

References

External links

1994 video games
3DO Interactive Multiplayer games
3DO Interactive Multiplayer-only games
Pinball video games
Video games developed in Japan